Pirjhalar railway station is a small railway station in Ujjain district, Madhya Pradesh. Its code is PJH. It serves Pir Jhalar village. The station consists of two platforms, neither of which is well sheltered. It lacks many facilities including water and sanitation.

References

Railway stations in Ujjain district
Ratlam railway division